Rebecca Chaplow (née Faulkner; born 19 August 1942), also known as Ripeka Chaplow, is a New Zealand mental health nurse and former netball player. She was inducted into the Māori Sports Hall of Fame in 2006.

Early life
Chaplow was born Rebecca Faulkner on 19 August 1942. Of Māori descent, she affiliates to Ngāi Te Rangi, Te Arawa, Tainui, and Ngāi Tūhoe, and came from Matapihi, a suburb of Tauranga in the Bay of Plenty region. In 1963, she was photographed by Ans Westra for a book by Gregory Riethmaier, titled Rebecca and the Maoris, in which she is seen going about her daily life in the Māori community. Judged against modern criteria, the book has been criticised for its patronising approach.

Netball career
A mid-court player, Faulkner played representative netball for Rotorua from 1962, and was named in the North Island team after the 1963 national netball championships. 

Faulkner was a member of the New Zealand team at the inaugural World Netball Championships at Eastbourne, England, in 1963, travelling with the team by ship, and spending three months away from New Zealand. She made her debut in the first-round match against , becoming the 31st player to be selected for the team. At the tournament, she played in four of the New Zealand team's ten matches in the round-robin tournament, facing stiff competition from Pamela Edmonds for the centre position. New Zealand recorded nine wins and one loss, 36–37 against Australia, to finish as runners-up.

In the 1970s, Chaplow was a coach for the Eastern Bay of Plenty netball team.

Later life
Chaplow trained as a nurse. In 1968, she met her husband, David Chaplow, who was a doctor, in Whakatāne, and the couple went on to have four children, including artist Arohanoa Mathews. David Chaplow went on to serve as the director of mental health for 10 years to 2011, and was appointed a Companion of the Queen's Service Order, for public services, in the 2001 New Year Honours.

Rebecca Chaplow worked in psychiatric court liaison, before completing a diploma in mental health and a diploma in management. In the 1980s, she worked at a psychiatric hospital in Australia before returning to New Zealand to work at the Mason Clinic, a secure psychiatric hospital in Auckland, and later for the Waikato District Health Board Māori mental health services. She then joined the Māori Health Directorate, part of the Ministry of Health, as a senior advisor.

Chaplow was inducted into the Māori Sports Hall of Fame in 2006. She sometimes uses the Māori form of her forename, and is thus also known as Ripeka Chaplow.

References

External links
 Chaplow interviewed as part of a film about the New Zealand team's trip by ship to the 1963 World Championships in England
 
 
 

1942 births
Living people
Ngāi Te Rangi people
Tainui people
Te Arawa people
Ngāi Tūhoe people
Sportspeople from Tauranga
New Zealand international netball players
New Zealand netball coaches
New Zealand nurses
1963 World Netball Championships players